Laurence Thomas Hergenhan  (15 March 1931 – 21 July 2019) was an Australian literary scholar. 

After completing his schooling at St Bernard's College, Katoomba, Hergenhan attended the University of Sydney, where he received his MA in 1953 and Diploma of Education in 1957. He completed his PhD at Birkbeck College in London before returning to Australia in 1960 to take up a lectureship at the University of Tasmania.

He was the founder and former editor of Australian Literary Studies (1963) and the editor of the 1988 Penguin New Literary History of Australia and published on Xavier Herbert. He was a professor emeritus of The University of Queensland.

Hergenhan was made an Officer of the Order of Australia in 1994 for "service to Australian literary scholarship and to education". He was elected a Fellow of the Australian Academy of the Humanities in 1993.

References

External links
 Resources for L. T. Hergenhan at National Library of Australia

1931 births
2019 deaths
Australian literary critics
Literary critics of English
Academic staff of the University of Queensland
Officers of the Order of Australia
Fellows of the Australian Academy of the Humanities